Insanabad is a village of Mardan District in the Khyber Pakhtunkhwa province of Pakistan. It is located at 34°5'55N 72°3'50E with an altitude of 288 metres (948 feet).

References

Populated places in Mardan District